CBTIS 11 (stands for "Centro de Bachillerato Tecnológico Industrial y de Servicios #11") is a preparatoria located in Hermosillo, Sonora, Mexico (known as "preparatoria"). It is part of DGETI's CBTIS chain of schools. Founded in 1963 for Juan Albert. CBTIS stands for Centro de Bachillerato Tecnologico, Industrial, y de Servicios.

References

External links 
 www.dgeti.sep.gob.mx

High schools in Mexico
Educational institutions established in 1963
Hermosillo
1963 establishments in Mexico